Cleisthenes can refer to:
 Cleisthenes, the reformer of ancient Athens.
 Cleisthenes of Sicyon, the ancient tyrant of Sicyon.
 Cleisthenes (son of Sibyrtius), an Athenian theoros satirized by Aristophanes 
 Cleisthenes (fish), a genus of flounders.